Gustavo Palafox (15 November 1923 – 21 August 2006) was a Mexican tennis player.

Life and career
Palafox won five Pan American Games gold medals during the 1950s.

He competed at the US National Championships four times and made the third round in 1952, with wins over Robert Kerdasha and Don Eisenberg, before a loss to 11th seed Gardnar Mulloy.

In Davis Cup tennis, Palafox took part in nine ties and 20 rubbers, for 10 wins. He beat Australian Ken McGregor in 1950 and four years later made history when he beat Vic Seixas, becoming the first Mexican to defeat an American in the Davis Cup.

Palafox died in Fort Lauderdale, Florida in August 2006 at the age of 82.

References

External links
 
 
 

1923 births
2006 deaths
Central American and Caribbean Games gold medalists for Mexico
Central American and Caribbean Games medalists in tennis
Medalists at the 1951 Pan American Games
Mexican male tennis players
Pan American Games bronze medalists for Mexico
Pan American Games gold medalists for Mexico
Pan American Games medalists in tennis
Tennis players at the 1951 Pan American Games
Tennis players at the 1955 Pan American Games
Tennis players at the 1959 Pan American Games
Sportspeople from Guadalajara, Jalisco
Mexican expatriates in the United States
20th-century Mexican people